Clearcut or clear cut may refer to:

Clearcutting, a forestry practice
Clearcutting in British Columbia

It may also refer to:

Clear-Cut (comics), a fictional character in the Marvel Comics Universe
Clear Cut: The Story of Philomath, Oregon, a 2006 American documentary film
Clear Cut Press, an American small press in Portland, Oregon
Clearcut, a 1991 Canadian drama film
Trümmerliteratur or "Clear-cutting literature", a German literary movement